Davronbek Uzgenbaevich Askarov (born 6 January 1988) is a Kyrgyzstani international footballer who plays as a left back.

Career
Askarov has played for Zhashtyk-Ak-Altyn Kara-Suu, Dordoi-Dynamo Naryn and Toulouse. He later played in Turkey for Elazığ Belediyespor (11 appearances) and Serhat Ardahan Spor (28 appearances).

He earned 37 caps for the Kyrgyzstan national team between 2006 and 2014, including 4 appearances in FIFA World Cup qualifying matches.

References

1988 births
Living people
Kyrgyzstani footballers
Kyrgyzstan international footballers
FC Zhashtyk-Ak-Altyn Kara-Suu players
FC Dordoi Bishkek players
Toulouse FC players
Elazığ Belediyespor players
Kyrgyz Premier League players
Association football fullbacks
Kyrgyzstani expatriate footballers
Kyrgyzstani expatriates in France
Expatriate footballers in France
Kyrgyzstani expatriate sportspeople in Turkey
Expatriate footballers in Turkey
Footballers at the 2006 Asian Games
Footballers at the 2010 Asian Games
Asian Games competitors for Kyrgyzstan